The Großes Wiesbachhorn is a mountain in the federal state of Salzburg, Austria and, at  (according to other sources ), is the third-highest peak of the Hohe Tauern range.

Its entirely free-standing firn-capped summit forms the main peak of the Fusch/Kaprun chain and is often viewed in Alpine literature as a rival of the Großglockner. The great slope on its eastern and southeastern side plunges about 2,300 metres to the Fuscher Ache - one of the greatest height differences between mountaintop and valley floor in the Eastern Alps. Of alpinistic significance was the first ascent of the Northwest Face (Nordwestwand) on 15 July 1924 by Franz Riegele and Willo Welzenbach. They were the first ones to use ice nails (Eisnägel) to assist them; these were later developed into the ice screws used today. The Northwest Face was one of the classic ice walls of the Eastern Alps; the ice has since melted, however.

Location and area 
The Großes Wiesbachhorn is almost entirely surrounded by glaciers. To the north is the Wielingerkees, to the northeast the Sandbodenkees flows eastwards and down into the Sandboden and further into the Fuscher Ache. To the south lies the Teufelsmühlkees und im Westen das  Kaindlkees. An important neighbouring mountain to the north, separated by the 3,211-metre-high wind gap of the Sandbodenscharte, is the Kleines Wiesbachhorn with a height of 3,286 metres. To the southwest, on the other side of the 3,265-metre-high Wielingerscharte, between the Kaindlkees and Teufelsmühlkees glaciers, lies the two Bratschenköpfe peaks (3,413 and 3,401 metres high). To the west the terrain falls away to the Mooserboden Reservoir, to the east into the Fuscher Tal. The nearest important settlement is Fusch an der Großglocknerstraße, about 10 kilometres away to the north as the crow flies.

Ascents 
The route originally used by the Fusch farmers at the end of the 18th century is rarely used today. It runs from Ferleiten and takes 3½ hours to reach the Schwarzenberg Hut and from there another 4 hours past the Bratschenköpfe peaks to the summit of the Horn. The usual present-day start point for ascents is the Heinrich Schwaiger Haus. From there the standard route runs over the Oberen Fochezkopf and along the Kaindlgrat ridge to the summit in about 3 hours. In the middle section of the route there is a 35° inclined firn edge (Firnschneide), the rock sections are rated at climbing grade UIAA I. The classic routes through the 500-metre-high Nordwest Face required ice climbing skills capable of coping with up to 60° gradients.

See also

List of highest mountains of Austria

Sources and maps 
 Willi End: Alpine Club Guide Glocknergruppe, Bergverlag Rother, Munich, 2003, 
 Eduard Richter: Die Erschliessung der Ostalpen, Vol III, Verlag des Deutschen und Oestereichischen Alpenvereins, Berlin 1894
 Alpine Club map 1:25.000, Sheet 40, Glocknergruppe

References 

Mountains of the Alps
Alpine three-thousanders
Glockner Group
Fusch an der Großglocknerstraße
Mountains of Salzburg (state)